Norah McCarthy was a Canadian figure skater who competed in single skating winning the 1940 national title, and pair skating. She competed in pairs first with Ralph McCreath, winning the 1939 and 1940 national titles, and later with Sandy McKechnie. She competed in the Canadian Figure Skating Championships and the North American Figure Skating Championships. Norah was also the daughter of the Canadian professional skating star, barrel jumper, and Canadian speed skater, Red McCarthy.

Results

Singles career

Pairs career
(with Ralph McCreath)

(with Sandy McKechnie)

References

External links 

Canadian female single skaters
Canadian female pair skaters